Notes for My Son is a 2020 Argentine drama film directed by Carlos Sorin and starring Mónica Antonópulos, Paola Barrientos and Valeria Bertuccelli.  Bertuccelli plays the terminal cancer mother who keeps a notebook of advice for her young son.

Plot summary
A woman with terminal cancer decides to keep a notebook full of musings on life and love for her toddler son to read after she dies.

Cast

References

External links
 
 

2020 films
2020 drama films
Spanish-language Netflix original films
Films about cancer